No Direction Home is the fourth release by North Carolina music group, Nantucket. Richard Gates and David "Thumbs" Johnson replaced drummer Kenny Soule and bassist Pee Wee Watson for this album, who both left the band in 1981 and joined guitarist Michael Gardner to form rock trio PKM. Featured singles include "Tennessee Whiskey," a version of the Bryan Adams song "Hiding From Love" and a version of the Marvin Gaye #1 hit classic "Ain't That Particular".

Track listing
No Direction Home (Redd) – 4:18
I Don't Want to Lose You (Redd/Uzzell) – 5:41
Hiding from Love (Adams/Vallance/Kagna) – 3:25
Ain't That Peculiar (Robinson/Moore/Tarplin/Rogers) – 3:25
Morning, Noon and Night (Redd) - 3:17
Ready for Your Love (Redd) - 3:50
Come Home Darling (Redd/Uzzell) - 4:11
Never Felt This Way Before (Redd) - 4:21
Girl I've Got Your Number (Redd) - 4:02
Tennessee Whiskey (Redd) - 3:35

Personnel
 Larry Uzzell: Lead & Background Vocals
 Tommy Redd: Guitar, Background Vocals
 Eddie Blair: Keyboards, Saxophone, Background Vocals
 Mark Downing: Guitar
 Richard Gates: Drums
 David "Thumbs" Johnson: Bass Guitar, Background Vocals

References
 Nantucket - A Band Of Desperate Men (PKM). Nantucket: Credits. Retrieved Apr. 21, 2007.
 The Daily Reflector. Nantucket: Credits. Retrieved Apr. 21, 2007.
 MusicMight. Nantucket: Credits. Retrieved Apr. 21, 2007.

See also
List of songs written by Bob Dylan
List of artists who have covered Bob Dylan songs

External links
 [ Nantucket on All Music Guide]
 Unofficial Nantucket Fansite
 Nantucket on MySpace

1983 albums
Nantucket (band) albums
RCA Records albums
Albums produced by Mike Flicker